Dennis Walter Filmer (26 June 1916 – 22 March 1981) was a Malaysian sports shooter. He competed in the 50 metre rifle, prone event at the 1964 Summer Olympics.

References

1916 births
1981 deaths
Malaysian male sport shooters
Olympic shooters of Malaysia
Shooters at the 1964 Summer Olympics